Irepodun/Ifelodun is a Local Government Area of Ekiti State, Nigeria. Irepodun/Ifelodun is predominantly a homogeneous society and carefully populated by Yoruba speaking people of the South West of Nigeria. It has an area of 356 km and a population of 129,149 at the 2006 census. The major religions of the people are Christianity and Islam while a percentage of the people are traditional religion worshippers.

The thriving industries in the local government include timber and saw mills which include Mighty Sawmill at Igede-Ekiti, Ilamoye Sawmill at Igede-Ekiti, Olorunde Sawmill at Iyin-Ekiti, Igbemo Rice at Igbemo Ekit, ROMACO Company at Igbemo Ekit, Okeorun Sawmill at Orun-Ekiti, Osalade Sawmil at Orun-Ekiti, Oke Uba Sawmill at Awo-Ekiti and Iyedi Sawmill at Igbemo-Ekiti; photo studios; and Hotels, some of which include Corner Stone Hotel, God's Health Hotel, Liberty Hotel and many more.

The places in the Irepodun Local Government that attract tourists from all over are the Osun Tourist Center and Elemi Tourist Center, both located at Igede-Ekiti.

The postal code of the area is 362.

Towns & Villages 
The major towns in Irepodun/Ifelodun are:

 Igede-Ekiti
 Iyin-Ekiti
 Orun-Ekiti
 Awo-Ekiti
 Iropora-Ekiti
 Eyio-Ekiti
 Esure-Ekiti
 Iworoko-Ekiti
 Are-Ekiti
 Afao-Ekiti
 Araromi Obo-Ekiti
 Igbemo-Ekiti
 Ikogosi-Ekiti
 Aramoko-Ekiti
 Erijiyan Ekiti

Irepodun/Ifelodun also comprises villages and farmsteads which include:

 Odo Uro
 Ejiko
 Okoro
 Amadin
 Itaasae
 Aba Olorunda
 Aroto
 Tungba
 Ita Ake
 Olusegun Camp
 Oriokuta Camp
 Aba Osun
 Asa Oloro
 Abuja Camp
 Surulere
 Oriokuta Camp
 Kajola Camp
 Ajebamidele I
 Araromi Oke Aro
 Ajayi Oke
 Ajayi Odo
 Temidire Camp
 Orisumibare Camp
 Ajebamidele II
 Kosubu Town
 Ita Oko Aba Camp
 Igbo Eku Camp

Gallery

References

Local Government Areas in Ekiti State
Local Government Areas in Yorubaland